Prunus cortapico is a species of tree in the family Rosaceae, and is native to Mexico, Guatemala and El Salvador.

References

External links
 

Trees of Mexico
Trees of Guatemala
Trees of El Salvador